Breck Road railway station was located on the Canada Dock Branch to the north of Townsend Lane between Anfield and Clubmoor, Liverpool, England. It opened on 1 July 1870 and closed on 31 May 1948.

By 2017 the only trace of the station was a bricked-up entrance at street level, but freight trains to and from Seaforth Dock still pass through the station site over the bridge. It was announced in December 2019 that Liverpool City Council had commissioned a feasibility study to see about reopening the Canada Dock Branch to passenger traffic.

References

Sources

External links
 The station's history Disused Stations
 The station and local lines on multiple maps Rail Maps Online
 The station on an Edwardian 25" OS map National Library of Scotland
 The branch with stations and mileages Railway Codes

Disused railway stations in Liverpool
Former London and North Western Railway stations
Railway stations in Great Britain opened in 1870
Railway stations in Great Britain closed in 1948